The 2008 Tulsa Golden Hurricane football team represented the University of Tulsa in the 2008 NCAA Division I FBS football season. The team's head coach was Todd Graham, in his second year at Tulsa. They played home games at Skelly Field at H. A. Chapman Stadium in Tulsa, Oklahoma and competed in the West Division of Conference USA (C-USA).

Schedule

Game summaries

UAB

North Texas

New Mexico

UCA

Rice

SMU

UTEP

UCF

Arkansas

Houston

Tulane

Marshall

East Carolina

Ball State

References

Tulsa
Tulsa Golden Hurricane football seasons
LendingTree Bowl champion seasons
Tulsa Golden Hurricane football